Tobel is a German word meaning gorge, and may refer to:

People
 Alexa von Tobel (born 1984), American entrepreneur
 Laurent Tobel (born 1975), French figure skater

Places
 Tobel, Thurgau, Switzerland
 Tobel-Tägerschen, Switzerland